The 2009–10 New Zealand Cricket Women's Twenty20 was the third season of the women's Twenty20 cricket competition played in New Zealand. It ran from December 2009 to January 2010, with 6 provincial teams taking part. Central Hinds beat Auckland Hearts in the final to win the tournament, their first Twenty20 title.

The tournament ran alongside the 2009–10 New Zealand Cricket Women's One Day Competition, which Central Hinds also won.

Competition format 
Teams played in a round-robin in a group of six, playing 5 matches overall. Matches were played using a Twenty20 format. The top two in the group advanced to the final.

The group worked on a points system with positions being based on the total points. Points were awarded as follows:

Win: 4 points 
Tie: 2 points 
Loss: 0 points.
Abandoned/No Result: 2 points.

Points table

Source: ESPN Cricinfo

 Advanced to the Final

Final

Statistics

Most runs

Source: ESPN Cricinfo

Most wickets

Source: ESPN Cricinfo

References

External links
 Series home at ESPN Cricinfo

Super Smash (cricket)
2009–10 New Zealand cricket season
New Zealand Cricket Women's Twenty20